This article lists described species of the family Asilidae start with letter D.

A
B
C
D
E
F
G
H
I
J
K
L
M
N
O
P
Q
R
S
T
U
V
W
Y
Z

List of Species

Genus Dakinomyia
 Dakinomyia froggattii (Dakin & Fordham, 1922)
 Dakinomyia secuta (Daniels, 1979)

Genus Damalina
 Damalina bicolora (Tomasovic, 2007)
 Damalina hirsuta (Wulp, 1872)
 Damalina hirtipes (Meijere, 1914)
 Damalina laticeps (Doleschall, 1858)
 Damalina nitida (Hermann, 1914)
 Damalina semperi (Osten-Sacken, 1882)

Genus Damalis
 Damalis achilles (Londt, 1989)
 Damalis albatus (Scarbrough, 2005)
 Damalis angola (Londt, 1989)
 Damalis artigasi (Joseph & Parui, 1985)
 Damalis basalis (Scarbrough, 2005)
 Damalis beijingensis (Shi, 1995)
 Damalis bicolor (Shi, 1995)
 Damalis brevis (Scarbrough, 2005)
 Damalis calicutensis (Joseph & Parui, 1990)
 Damalis carapacina (Oldroyd, 1972)
 Damalis cederholmi (Joseph & Parui, 1985)
 Damalis centurionis (Oldroyd, 1972)
 Damalis chelomakolon (Londt, 1989)
 Damalis compacta (Hull, 1962)
 Damalis concolor (Walker, 1861)
 Damalis conica (Shi, 1995)
 Damalis conspicua (Curran, 1934)
 Damalis dattai (Joseph & Parui, 1999)
 Damalis dentata (Joseph & Parui, 1987)
 Damalis divisa (Walker, 1855)
 Damalis dorsalis (Walker, 1857)
 Damalis doryphorus (Londt, 1989)
 Damalis dravidica (Joseph & Parui, 1985)
 Damalis drilus (Londt, 1989)
 Damalis dubia (Joseph & Parui, 1995)
 Damalis fascia (Shi, 1995)
 Damalis flaventis (Scarbrough, 2005)
 Damalis floresana (Frey, 1934)
 Damalis formosana (Frey, 1934)
 Damalis fulvus (Scarbrough, 2005)
 Damalis furcula (Londt, 1989)
 Damalis fuscipennis (Macquart, 1846)
 Damalis grossa (Schiner, 1868)
 Damalis himalayaensis (Joseph & Parui, 1987)
 Damalis hirtalula (Shi, 1995)
 Damalis hirtidorsalis (Shi, 1995)
 Damalis indica (Joseph & Parui, 1985)
 Damalis infuscata (Joseph & Parui, 1984)
 Damalis kassebeeri (Geller-Grimm, 1997)
 Damalis keralaensis (Joseph & Parui, 1985)
 Damalis knysna (Londt, 1989)
 Damalis kottayamensis (Joseph & Parui, 1995)
 Damalis londti (Scarbrough, 2005)
 Damalis limipidipennis (Joseph & Parui, 1990)
 Damalis lugens (Walker, 1861)
 Damalis macula (Scarbrough, 2005)
 Damalis monochaetes (Londt, 1989)
 Damalis neavei (Londt, 1989)
 Damalis nigella (Wulp, 1872)
 Damalis nigrabdomina (Shi, 1995)
 Damalis nigripalpis (Shi, 1995)
 Damalis nigriscans (Shi, 1995)
 Damalis pallida (Wulp, 1872)
 Damalis politus (Scarbrough, 2005)
 Damalis pseudoartigasi (Joseph & Parui, 1987)
 Damalis rufoabdominalis (Joseph & Parui, 1985)
 Damalis scrobiculata (Frey, 1934)
 Damalis sphekodes (Londt, 1989)
 Damalis spinifemurata (Shi, 1995)
 Damalis turneri (Londt, 1989)
 Damalis vitalisi (Frey, 1934)
 Damalis xaniomerus (Londt, 1989)

Genus Danomyia
 Danomyia aethiops (Londt, 1993)
 Danomyia forchhammeri (Londt, 1993)
 Danomyia habra (Londt, 1993)
 Danomyia hepsocrene (Londt, 1993)
 Danomyia pachyphallus (Londt, 1993)
 Danomyia sathos (Londt, 1993)
 Danomyia tanaos (Londt, 1993)

Genus Daptolestes
 Daptolestes nicholsoni (Hull, 1962)

Genus Dasophrys
 Dasophrys boslacus (Londt, 1981)
 Dasophrys brevistylus (Londt, 1981)
 Dasophrys bullatus (Londt, 1981)
 Dasophrys carinatus (Londt, 1981)
 Dasophrys compressus (Hull, 1967)
 Dasophrys crenulatus (Londt, 1981)
 Dasophrys croetzeei (Londt, 1985)
 Dasophrys dorattina (Londt, 1981)
 Dasophrys engeli (Londt, 1981)
 Dasophrys fortis (Londt, 1981)
 Dasophrys hypselopterus (Engel, 1929)
 Dasophrys hysnotos (Londt, 1981)
 Dasophrys irwini (Londt, 1981)
 Dasophrys loewi (Londt, 1981)
 Dasophrys minutus (Londt, 1981)
 Dasophrys montanus (Londt, 1981)
 Dasophrys nanus (Londt, 1981)
 Dasophrys natalensis (Ricardo, 1920)
 Dasophrys nigricans (Wiedemann, 1821)
 Dasophrys nigroflavipes (Hobby, 1933)
 Dasophrys nigroseta (Londt, 1981)
 Dasophrys oldroydi (Londt, 1981)
 Dasophrys reburrus (Londt, 1981)
 Dasophrys saliotragus (Londt, 1981)
 Dasophrys silvestris (Londt, 1981)
 Dasophrys swazi (Londt, 1981)
 Dasophrys umbripennis (Londt, 1981)

Genus Daspletis
 Daspletis hirtus (Ricardo, 1925)
 Daspletis lykos (Londt, 1985)
 Daspletis placodes (Londt, 1983)
 Daspletis stenoura (Londt, 1983)

Genus Dasylechia
 Dasylechia atrox (Williston, 1883)

Genus Dasyllis
 Dasyllis albicollis (Bigot, 1878)
 Dasyllis erythrura (Hermann, 1912)

Genus Dasypecus
 Dasypecus heteroneurus (Philippi, 1865)
 Dasypecus latus (Philippi, 1865)

Genus Dasypogon
 Dasypogon aequalis (Walker, 1857)
 Dasypogon albonotatus (Macquart, 1847)
 Dasypogon analis (Macquart, 1850)
 Dasypogon arcuatus (Fabricius, 1794)
 Dasypogon atripennis (Macquart, 1834)
 Dasypogon aurarius (Wiedemann, 1821)
 Dasypogon auripilus (Séguy, 1934)
 Dasypogon australis (Macquart, 1838)
 Dasypogon bacescui (Weinberg, 1979)
 Dasypogon brevipennis (Meigen, 1838)
 Dasypogon caffer (Wiedemann, 1828)
 Dasypogon caudatus (Fabricius, 1805)
 Dasypogon caudatus (Bigot, 1881)
 Dasypogon cephicus (Say, 1829)
 Dasypogon costalis (Lynch & Arribálzaga, 1880)
 Dasypogon crassus (Macquart, 1849)
 Dasypogon dorsalis (Macquart, 1848)
 Dasypogon fabricii (Wiedemann, 1820)
 Dasypogon flavipennis (Wiedemann, 1828)
 Dasypogon fossius (Walker, 1849)
 Dasypogon fraternus (Macquart, 1846)
 Dasypogon geradi (Weinberg, 1987)
 Dasypogon gougeleti (Bigot, 1878)
 Dasypogon iberus (Tomasovic, 1999)
 Dasypogon irinelae (Weinberg, 1986)
 Dasypogon lebasii (Macquart, 1838)
 Dasypogon lenticeps (Thomson, 1869)
 Dasypogon longus (Macquart, 1838)
 Dasypogon lugens (Philippi, 1865)
 Dasypogon magisi (Tomasovic, 1999)
 Dasypogon melanopterus (Loew, 1869)
 Dasypogon mexicanus (Macquart, 1846)
 Dasypogon nigripennis (Macquart, 1848)
 Dasypogon nigriventris (Dufour, 1833)
 Dasypogon occlusus (Meijere, 1906)
 Dasypogon olcesci (Bigot, 1878)
 Dasypogon parvus (Rondani, 1850)
 Dasypogon pumilus (Macquart, 1838)
 Dasypogon punctipennis (Macquart, 1838)
 Dasypogon regenstreifi (Weinberg, 1986)
 Dasypogon reinhardi (Wiedemann, 1824)
 Dasypogon rubiginipennis (Macquart, 1838)
 Dasypogon rubiginosus (Bigot, 1878)
 Dasypogon rubinipes (Becker, 1913)
 Dasypogon ruficauda (Fabricius, 1805)
 Dasypogon rufiventris (Wiedemann, 1821)
 Dasypogon rufiventris (Walker, 1854)
 Dasypogon sericeus (Philippi, 1865)
 Dasypogon tenuis (Macquart, 1838)
 Dasypogon tragicus (Wiedemann, 1828)
 Dasypogon tsacasi (Weinberg, 1991)

Genus Despotiscus
 Despotiscus simmondsi (Bezzi, 1928)

Genus Dichaetothyrea
 Dichaetothyrea clavifrons (Londt, 1982)

Genus Dicolonus
 Dicolonus nigricentrus (Adisoemarto & Wood, 1975)
 Dicolonus pulchrum (Adisoemarto & Wood, 1975)
 Dicolonus simplex (Loew, 1866)

Genus Dicranus
 Dicranus jaliscoensis (Williston, 1901)
 Dicranus nigerrimus (Carrera, 1955)
 Dicranus rutilus (Wiedemann, 1821)
 Dicranus tucma (Lynch & Arribálzaga, 1880)

Genus Dicropaltum
 Dicropaltum rubicundus (Hine, 1909)

Genus Dikowmyia
 Dikowmyia mediorus (Londt, 2002)

Genus Dioctobroma
 Dioctobroma flavoterminatum (Hull, 1962)

Genus Dioctria

 Dioctria abdominalis (Becker, 1923)
 Dioctria annulata (Meigen, 1820)
 Dioctria arbustorum (Lehr, 1965)
 Dioctria arcana (Richter, 1966)
 Dioctria arnoldii (Richter, 1964)
 Dioctria arthritica (Loew, 1871)
 Dioctria atricapilla (Meigen, 1804)
 Dioctria atrorubens (Séguy, 1930)
 Dioctria berlandi (Séguy, 1927)
 Dioctria bicincta (Meigen, 1820)
 Dioctria bigoti (Costa, 1884)
 Dioctria bithynica (Janssens, 1968)
 Dioctria bulgarica (Hradský & Moucha, 1964)
 Dioctria caesia (Wiedemann, 1818)
 Dioctria calceata (Meigen, 1820)
 Dioctria claripennis (Villeneuve, 1908)
 Dioctria clavifrons (Enderlein, 1934)
 Dioctria concoloris (Esipenko, 1971)
 Dioctria conspicua (Becker, 1923)
 Dioctria contraria (Becker, 1923)
 Dioctria cornuta (Lehr, 2002)
 Dioctria cothurnata (Meigen, 1820)
 Dioctria cretensis (Becker, 1923)
 Dioctria danica (Schrank, 1803)
 Dioctria dispar (Loew, 1871)
 Dioctria flavicincta (Meigen, 1820)
 Dioctria freidbergi (Theodor, 1980)
 Dioctria gussakovskii (Lehr, 1965)
 Dioctria hermonensis (Theodor, 1980)
 Dioctria hohlbecki (Lehr, 1965)
 Dioctria humeralis (Zeller, 1840)
 Dioctria hyalipennis (Fabricius, 1794)
 Dioctria keremza (Richter, 1970)
 Dioctria kowarzi (Frivaldszky, 1877)
 Dioctria lata (Loew, 1853)
 Dioctria leleji (Lehr, 1999)
 Dioctria lenta (Becker, 1923)
 Dioctria linearis (Fabricius, 1787)
 Dioctria liturata (Loew, 1873)
 Dioctria longicornis (Meigen, 1820)
 Dioctria lugens (Loew, 1873)
 Dioctria maslovi (Esipenko, 1971)
 Dioctria meridionalis (Bezzi, 1898)
 Dioctria mixta (Becker, 1923)
 Dioctria nakanensis (Matsumura, 1916)
 Dioctria navasi (Séguy, 1929)
 Dioctria niedli (Moucha & Hradský, 1963)
 Dioctria nigribarba (Loew, 1871)
 Dioctria nigronitida (Lehr, 1965)
 Dioctria notha (Séguy, 1941)
 Dioctria ochrifacies (Becker, 1906)
 Dioctria parvula (Coquillett, 1893)
 Dioctria pilithorax (Richter, 1960)
 Dioctria pleuralis (Banks, 1917)
 Dioctria podagrica (Schrank, 1781)
 Dioctria pollinosa (Loew, 1870)
 Dioctria popovi (Lehr, 1965)
 Dioctria puerilis (Becker, 1923)
 Dioctria pusio (Osten-Sacken, 1877)
 Dioctria rufa (Strobl, 1906)
 Dioctria rufipes (De Geer, 1776)
 Dioctria rufithorax (Loew, 1853)
 Dioctria rufonigra (Theodor, 1980)
 Dioctria rungsi (Timon-David, 1951)
 Dioctria samarana (Becker, 1923)
 Dioctria scopini (Lehr, 1965)
 Dioctria segmentaria (Becker, 1923)
 Dioctria stigmatizans (Fabricius, 1805)
 Dioctria striata (Theodor, 1980)
 Dioctria sudetica (Duda, 1940)
 Dioctria valida (Loew, 1856)
 Dioctria variabilis (Lehr, 1965)
 Dioctria vera (Back, 1909)
 Dioctria vulpecula (Richter, 1973)
 Dioctria wiedemanni (Meigen, 1820)
 Dioctria wilcoxi (Adisoemarto & Wood, 1975)
 Dioctria zhelochovtzevi (Lehr, 1965)

Genus Diogmites
 Diogmites aberrans (Wiedemann, 1821)
 Diogmites affinis (Bellardi, 1861)
 Diogmites alvesi Carrera, 1949 the species author is not Curran, contrary to an error in multiple web databases
 Diogmites amethistinus Carrera, 1953
 Diogmites angustipennis Loew, 1866
 Diogmites anomalus Carrera, 1947
 Diogmites atriapex Carrera, 1953
 Diogmites aureolus Carrera & Papavero, 1962
 Diogmites basalis (Walker, 1851)
 Diogmites bellardi (Bromley, 1929)
 Diogmites bicolor (Jaennicke, 1867)
 Diogmites bifasciatus Carrera, 1949
 Diogmites bilineatus (Loew, 1866)
 Diogmites bilobatus Barnes, 2010
 Diogmites bimaculatus (Bromley, 1929)
 Diogmites bromleyi Carrera, 1949
 Diogmites brunneus (Fabricius, 1787)
 Diogmites castaneus (Macquart, 1838)
 Diogmites coffeatus (Wiedemann, 1819)
 Diogmites coloradensis (James, 1933)
 Diogmites contortus Bromley, 1936
 Diogmites craveri (Bellardi, 1861)
 Diogmites crudelis Bromley, 1936
 Diogmites cuantlensis (Bellardi, 1861)
 Diogmites discolor Loew, 1866
 Diogmites dubius (Bellardi, 1861)
 Diogmites duillius (Walker, 1849)
 Diogmites esuriens Bromley, 1936
 Diogmites fasciatus (Macquart, 1834)
 Diogmites ferrugineus (Lynch & Arribálzaga, 1880)
 Diogmites fragilis Bromley, 1936
 Diogmites goniostigma Bellardi, 1861
 Diogmites grossus (Bromley, 1936)
 Diogmites herennius (Walker, 1849)
 Diogmites heydenii (Jaennicke, 1867)
 Diogmites imitator Carrera, 1953
 Diogmites inclusus (Walker, 1851)
 Diogmites intactus (Wiedemann, 1828)
 Diogmites jalapensis Bellardi, 1861
 Diogmites lindigii (Schiner, 1868)
 Diogmites lineola (Bromley, 1934)
 Diogmites litoralis (Curran, 1930)
 Diogmites maculatus Curran, 1934
 Diogmites memnon Osten-Sacken, 1887
 Diogmites misellus Loew, 1866
 Diogmites missouriensis Bromley, 1951
 Diogmites neoternatus (Bromley, 1931)
 Diogmites nigripennis (Macquart, 1847)
 Diogmites nigripes (Bellardi, 1861)
 Diogmites nigritarsis (Macquart, 1846)
 Diogmites notatus Bigot, 1878
 Diogmites obscurus Carrera, 1949
 Diogmites perplexus Back, 1909
 Diogmites platypterus Loew, 1866
 Diogmites pritchardi Bromley, 1936
 Diogmites properans Bromley, 1936
 Diogmites pseudojalapensis (Bellardi, 1862)
 Diogmites pulcher (Back, 1909)
 Diogmites reticulatus (Fabricius, 1805)
 Diogmites rubescens (Bellardi, 1861)
 Diogmites rubrodorsatus (Artigas, 1966)
 Diogmites rufibasis Bigot, 1878
 Diogmites rufipalpis (Macquart, 1838)
 Diogmites sallei (Bellardi, 1861)
 Diogmites salutans Bromley, 1936
 Diogmites superbus Carrera, 1953
 Diogmites symmachus (Loew, 1872)
 Diogmites tau Osten-Sacken, 1887
 Diogmites teresita Lamas, 1972
 Diogmites ternatus Loew, 1866
 Diogmites texanus Bromley, 1934
 Diogmites tricolor (Bellardi, 1861)
 Diogmites unicolor Hull, 1958
 Diogmites virescens (Bellardi, 1861)
 Diogmites vulgaris Carrera, 1947
 Diogmites winthemi (Wiedemann, 1821)
 Diogmites wygodzinskyi Carrera, 1949
 Diogmites vulgaris (Carrera, 1947)
 Diogmites winthemi (Wiedemann, 1821)
 Diogmites wygodzinskyi (Carrera, 1949)

Genus Diplosynapsis
 Diplosynapsis argentifascia (Enderlein, 1914)
 Diplosynapsis cellatus (Schiner, 1868)
 Diplosynapsis halterata (Enderlein, 1914)
 Diplosynapsis remus (Tomasovic, 2002)

Genus Dissmeryngodes
 Dissmeryngodes amapa (Artigas & Papavero, 1991)
 Dissmeryngodes iracema (Artigas & Papavero, 1991)

Genus Dogonia
 Dogonia nigra (Oldroyd, 1970)
 Dogonia saegeri (Oldroyd, 1970)

Genus Dolopus
 Dolopus genitalis (Hardy, 1920)
 Dolopus mirus (Daniels, 1987)
 Dolopus silvestris (Daniels, 1987)
 Dolopus simulans (Daniels, 1987)

Genus Dysmachus
 Dysmachus albiseta (Becker, 1907)
 Dysmachus albisetosus (Macquart, 1850)
 Dysmachus albovestitus (Villeneuve, 1930)
 Dysmachus americanus (Macquart, 1846)
 Dysmachus antipai (Weinberg, 1968)
 Dysmachus appendiculatus (Schiner, 1867)
 Dysmachus atripes (Loew, 1871)
 Dysmachus basalis (Loew, 1848)
 Dysmachus bequaerti (Tomasovic, 2001)
 Dysmachus bidentatus (Becker, 1923)
 Dysmachus bilobus (Loew, 1871)
 Dysmachus bulbosus (Theodor, 1980)
 Dysmachus cephalenus (Loew, 1871)
 Dysmachus dasyproctus (Loew, 1871)
 Dysmachus dentiger (Richter, 1962)
 Dysmachus digitulus (Becker, 1923)
 Dysmachus echinurus (Richter, 1962)
 Dysmachus elapsus (Villeneuve, 1933)
 Dysmachus evanescens (Villeneuve, 1912)
 Dysmachus femoratellus (Loew, 1871)
 Dysmachus fraudator (Lehr, 1966)
 Dysmachus gratiosus (Richter, 1973)
 Dysmachus harpagonis (Séguy, 1929)
 Dysmachus hermonensis (Theodor, 1980)
 Dysmachus hiulcus (Pandellé, 1905)
 Dysmachus kasachstanicus (Lehr, 1966)
 Dysmachus kiritschenkoi (Lehr, 1966)
 Dysmachus kuznetzovi (Lehr, 1996)
 Dysmachus medius (Lehr, 1966)
 Dysmachus monticola (Lehr, 1966)
 Dysmachus montium (Richter, 1962)
 Dysmachus obtusus (Becker, 1923)
 Dysmachus olympicus (Janssens, 1958)
 Dysmachus ornatus (Theodor, 1980)
 Dysmachus putoni (Séguy, 1927)
 Dysmachus rectus (Becker, 1923)
 Dysmachus safranboluticus (Hasbenli & Geller-Grimm, 1999)
 Dysmachus schurovenkovi (Lehr, 1972)
 Dysmachus setiger (Loew, 1848)
 Dysmachus setipyga (Becker, 1923)
 Dysmachus strigitibia (Curran, 1931)
 Dysmachus suludereae (Hasbenli & Geller-Grimm, 1999)
 Dysmachus transcaucasicus (Richter, 1962)
 Dysmachus trilobus (Strobl, 1898)
 Dysmachus uschinskii (Lehr, 1966)
 Dysmachus zaitzevi (Lehr, 1996)

References 

 
Asilidae
Articles containing video clips